The Colorado Rockies were an American professional ice hockey team in the National Hockey League (NHL) that played in Denver from 1976 to 1982.

Franchise history

Ivan Mullenix, owner of the Central Hockey League's Denver Spurs, had been awarded a "conditional" NHL franchise for the 1976–77 season. With McNichols Sports Arena already completed by 1975, he looked to enter the NHL a year early, and the league attempted to broker an arrangement by which he would acquire the struggling California Golden Seals and move them to Denver in lieu of an expansion team. At the same time, the Pittsburgh Penguins would be sold to a Seattle-based group that had also won a conditional franchise for that city.

The proposed arrangement fell through, however, and with the continuing franchise difficulties, the NHL called off the 1976–77 expansion. The Spurs then elected to move to the World Hockey Association (WHA) for the 1975–76 season, but Denver fans did not consider the WHA a major league and stayed away in droves. By December, rumors that the NHL was preparing to move either the Seals or Kansas City Scouts to Denver led Mullenix to conclude he could not survive in the city. Out of desperation, he moved the Spurs to Ottawa almost halfway through the season. However, the renamed Ottawa Civics lasted only two weeks before folding.

Meanwhile, the Scouts were on the verge of collapse despite having entered the NHL only two years earlier. Although they suffered through a 12-win season in 1975–76, they still fared better on the ice over their first two years than their expansion cousins, the Washington Capitals. However, Capitals' owner Abe Pollin was far better financed than the 37-member consortium that owned the Scouts, and had the patience to handle the typical struggles of an expansion team. Additionally, the Scouts were hobbled by an economic downturn in the Midwest. Facing almost $1 million in debt, the Scouts' owners decided to sell the franchise after a season ticket drive sold only 2,000 tickets. A Denver-based group headed by Jack Vickers purchased the Scouts and moved them to Denver, renaming them the Colorado Rockies. The team would remain in the Smythe Division of the Campbell Conference.

Continued struggles
Despite a new name and a new city, the team's situation did not improve significantly. In their six seasons of existence, the Rockies made the Stanley Cup playoffs only once, in 1977–78. Even then, they finished with the sixth-worst record in the league, 21 games under .500. However, the Smythe Division was so weak that year that the Rockies finished second behind the Chicago Black Hawks, the only team in the division with a .500 record. This allowed them to edge out the Vancouver Canucks for the last playoff spot by only two points (in those days, the division runners-up were guaranteed a playoff spot). The Rockies went down rather meekly in the first round, losing to the Philadelphia Flyers in a two-game sweep. They would never even approach the .500 mark during their six years in Denver. Indeed, the 1977–78 season would be the only one during that time where they even came close to a playoff berth.

The Rockies did have some star players for a short time. Barry Beck set a record in his rookie year for goals by a rookie defenseman, and Hall of Fame right winger Lanny McDonald was picked up in a trade with Toronto. In addition, they at various times had such players as Chico Resch, Wilf Paiement, Rene Robert, Rob Ramage, and Bobby Schmautz. However, the team suffered a constant lack of overall depth, and trades tended to sacrifice quality for quantity. Plagued by instability, the Rockies had seven coaches in four years, none lasting more than one full season, and ownership changed hands twice in four years. Attendance was fairly respectable, considering that the team was barely competitive on the ice and unstable off it.

Under Don Cherry
One of the few bright spots in the franchise's history came during the 1979–80 season, when the flamboyant Don Cherry, a former Jack Adams Award winner, was named head coach after being fired by the Boston Bruins. Under Cherry, the Rockies adopted the motto "Come to the fights and watch a Rockies game break out!" The phrase was plastered on billboards all over Denver in the 1979–80 season.

As he later admitted, Cherry's outspokenness and feuding with Rockies general manager Ray Miron did not endear him to the front office. While Cherry was adept at motivating the players, goaltending was still the team's weakness, as Miron refused to replace Hardy Astrom, whom Cherry dubbed "The Swedish Sieve". Cherry recalled one game where his players had gotten ten shots on goal without scoring, but Astrom then conceded a goal from the opponent's first shot and so was pulled from net.

The Rockies finished with 51 points, tied for the worst record in the league. In their final game, which was held at home, Cherry's team defeated the Penguins 5–0. As it was already known that Cherry would not return the next season, he wore a cowboy hat and cowboy boots for what would be his last NHL game. After the final buzzer sounded, his players formed two lines for him, raising their sticks to form an arch for Cherry to walk under while acknowledging the cheers of the crowd.

Move to New Jersey
The failure of Vickers' petroleum business left him unable to pay the lease at McNichols Arena in 1978. The deal was unfavorable from the beginning, as the Rockies never received any revenue from parking, concessions, or advertising. Vickers sold the Rockies on July 12 of that year to Arthur Imperatore Sr., whose intention was to keep the franchise in Denver before moving it to the new arena at the Meadowlands Sports Complex in New Jersey which was under construction and expected to be completed by 1980. His imposition of the team's eventual transfer alienated many fans. Before he could complete the move, however, Imperatore sold the Rockies to Buffalo-based cable television magnate Peter Gilbert; the NHL Board of Governors unanimously approved the sale on February 10, 1981. At the time, the NHL seemed to be committed to keeping a team in Denver. Gilbert had promised not to move the team, and league president John Ziegler said that he wanted to make the Rockies a model franchise.

Finally in 1982, after a failed bid by an Ottawa-based ownership group intent on moving the Rockies to the Canadian capital, the franchise was sold in May to New Jersey shipping tycoon John McMullen, who also owned Major League Baseball's Houston Astros. He announced that he had "big plans" for the franchise, but they involved making the long-awaited move to New Jersey. The team was relocated for the 1982–83 season and renamed the New Jersey Devils.

Legacy
The last active NHL player who had played for the Rockies was Joe Cirella, who retired from the NHL following the 1995–96 NHL season and played his final professional season for the Kölner Haie in Germany in 1997. In that season, incidentally, Colorado saw the NHL return to Denver after 13 years, when the Quebec Nordiques moved to the city and became known as the Colorado Avalanche. Additionally, Rockies draft pick Bruce Driver played in the NHL until 1998, but did not join the team until 1983, a year after their move to New Jersey.

Two other former Rockies, Paul Gagne and Rich Chernomaz, played until 1999 in the Swiss and German leagues, respectively.

The 2001 Stanley Cup Finals pitted the teams that have called Colorado home (past and present) in their histories against each other. The Avalanche defeated the Devils in seven games.

The Rockies are credited as being the first team to use the Gary Glitter song "Rock and Roll, Part 2" at a sporting event. The team played it after every goal scored by a Rockies player. Other NHL teams picked up on this practice, as did teams in other leagues,. In recent years, however, Glitter's child sex offenses caused teams to distance themselves from the song.

The Rockies' original logo, a mountain peak with the silhouette of the flag of Colorado, served as inspiration for the Avalanche's secondary logo on their current third jerseys, which were first unveiled in the 2015–16 season. The "C" on the aforementioned logo was also emblazoned on the primary jersey's shoulders as well. The logo was also used on the jersey of the Avalanche for the 2016 Stadium Series.

In the 2022–23 season, both the Colorado Avalanche and the New Jersey Devils wore "Reverse Retro" uniforms featuring the Rockies' red, gold and blue palette.

Season-by-season record
Note: GP = Games played, W = Wins, L = Losses, T = Ties, Pts = Points, GF = Goals for, GA = Goals against, PIM = Penalties minutes

Team captains
 Simon Nolet 1976–77
 Wilf Paiement 1977–79
 Gary Croteau 1979–80
 Mike Christie 1980
 Rene Robert 1980–81
 Lanny McDonald 1981
 Rob Ramage 1981–82

First round draft picks
Note: This list does not include selections as the Kansas City Scouts.
 1976: Paul Gardner (11th overall)
 1977: Barry Beck (2nd overall)
 1978: Mike Gillis (5th overall)
 1979: Rob Ramage (1st overall)
 1980: Paul Gagne (19th overall)
 1981: Joe Cirella (5th overall)

Hall of Famers
 Lanny McDonald, RW, 1979–1981

Colorado Rockies individual records
Most goals in a season: Wilf Paiement, 41 (1976–77)
Most assists in a season: Wilf Paiement, 56 (1977–78)
Most points in a season: Wilf Paiement, 87 (1977–78)
Most penalty minutes in a season: Rob Ramage, 201 (1981–82)
Most points in a season, defenceman: Barry Beck, 60 (1977–78)
Most points in a season, rookie: Barry Beck, 60 (1977–78)
Most wins in a season: Chico Resch, 16 (1981–82)

Broadcasters
KWGN 2 was the over-the-air television broadcaster throughout the Rockies' existence. From 1976–79, Joe Starkey was the play-by-play announcer for radio and television simulcasts. Don Earle was the secondary play-by-play man in 1977–78. Beginning in 1979–80 and on through the end of their final season in Colorado, Norm Jones was both the radio and television play-by-play man. Ralph Backstrom (1979–80), Jack Jolly (1980–81), and Sandy Clough (1981–82) were the radio color commentators (Clough solely worked home games). From 1979 to 1982, Jim Conrad did color commentary alongside Norm Jones on television.

References

External links

 Year-by-year on hockeydb.com

 
Defunct National Hockey League teams
Ice hockey teams in Colorado
Rockies
History of the New Jersey Devils
Ice hockey clubs established in 1976
Ice hockey clubs disestablished in 1982
Sports teams in Denver
1976 establishments in Colorado
1982 disestablishments in Colorado
Defunct sports teams in Colorado